The 2016 Canadian Direct Insurance BC Men's Curling Championship were held from February 10 to 14 at the Nelson Curling Club in Nelson, British Columbia. The winning Jim Cotter rink represented British Columbia at the 2016 Tim Hortons Brier in Ottawa.

Qualification process
Sixteen teams qualified for the provincial tournament through several methods. The qualification process is as follows:

Teams
The teams are listed as follows:

*Regular skip Tyler Tardi could not play due to his participation at the 2016 Winter Youth Olympics. Records indicate they only had a three player team.

Knockout Draw Brackets
The draw is listed as follows:

A Event

B Event

C Event

Playoffs

A vs. B
Saturday, February 13, 2:00 pm

C1 vs. C2
Saturday, February 13, 7:00 pm

Semifinal
Sunday, February 14, 11:00 am

Final
Sunday, February 14, 4:00 pm

References

External links

Curling in British Columbia
2016 Tim Hortons Brier
Nelson, British Columbia